Events from the year 1735 in Denmark.

Incumbents
 Monarch – Christian VI
 Prime minister – Iver Rosenkrantz (until 12 May), Johan Ludvig Holstein-Ledreborg

Events

 Vemmetofte Convent is established after the death of Princess Sophia Hedwig through her will.

Births
 6 January – Otto Christopher von Munthe af Morgenstierne, civil servant, judge and landowner (died 1809)
 1 March – Caroline Thielo, actress (died 1754)
 28 August – Andreas Peter Bernstorff, politician (died 1797)

Deaths
 13 March – Princess Sophia Hedwig, princess of Denmark (born 1677)
 22 April - Lorentz Reichwein, military officer (born 1680)

References

 
1730s in Denmark
Denmark
Years of the 18th century in Denmark